The 2007 Saskatchewan Roughriders finished in 2nd place in the West Division with a 12–6 record, which was their highest finish since 1988 when they also finished 2nd. The Roughriders won their third Grey Cup championship after playing the Winnipeg Blue Bombers for the title.

Offseason

CFL Draft

Preseason

Regular season

Season standings

Season schedule

Player stats

Passing

Rushing

Receiving

Postseason

Scotiabank West Semi-Finals

Scotiabank West Finals

Grey Cup
 

Saskatchewan ended the Canadian Football League's longest championship drought with a 23–19 victory over the Winnipeg Blue Bombers in the 95th Grey Cup at Rogers Centre. The Roughriders had not won a title since 1989, and had lost in 13 of their 15 all-time appearances.

An interception by defensive back James Johnson with 54 seconds left in the fourth quarter sealed the victory. It also earned Johnson a place in CFL history – because he became the first player to intercept three passes in a Grey Cup game, and also because he was named the game's MVP. Roughriders receiver Andy Fantuz was named the game's Most Outstanding Canadian. The 23-year-old caught four passes for 70 yards and a touchdown.

Awards and records
 Kent Austin, CFL Coach of the Year
 Kerry Joseph, Most Outstanding Player Award
 Kerry Joseph, Jeff Nicklin Memorial Trophy
 James Johnson, Grey Cup Most Valuable Player
 James Johnson, first player to intercept three passes in a Grey Cup game
 Andy Fantuz, Grey Cup Most Outstanding Canadian

CFL All-Stars
Kerry Joseph, Quarterback
Jeremy O'Day, Centre

CFL Western All-Stars
D. J. Flick, Receiver
Reggie Hunt, Linebacker
James Johnson, Cornerback
Kerry Joseph, Quarterback
Maurice Lloyd, Linebacker
Gene Makowsky, Offensive Tackle
Jeremy O'Day, Centre
Fred Perry, Defensive End

References

Saskatchewan Roughriders
Saskatchewan Roughriders seasons
Grey Cup championship seasons